Ponte de Ázere is a bridge in Portugal. It is located in Arcos de Valdevez Municipality, Viana do Castelo District.

See also
List of bridges in Portugal

Bridges in Viana do Castelo District
Arcos de Valdevez